Uniplex may refer to:

 Simplex
 Uniplexed, the rumored U in Unix (or Unics); as opposed to the multiplexed of Multics

See also
 Simplex (disambiguation)
 Duplex (disambiguation)
 Multiplex (disambiguation)